Jimmy Christopher Banks Jr. (born August 24, 1989) is an American former soccer player who played as a forward.

Career

College and amateur
Banks attended Riverside High School, where he was a four-time All-Conference, played in the Region II Olympic Development Program, and played club soccer for FC Milwaukee, before going on to play four years of college soccer at the University of Wisconsin Green Bay. At Green Bay he was the Horizon League all-newcomer team as a freshman in 2007, was the 2009 Horizon League Player of the Year, and was a 2010 All-League First Team and All-Great Lakes Second Team selection. JC was inducted into the University of Wisconsin Green Bay's Hall of Fame in 2018.

During his college years Banks also played for the Madison 56ers in the National Premier Soccer League and Chicago Fire Premier in the USL Premier Development League.

Professional
Banks was drafted in the first round (8th overall) of the 2011 MLS Supplemental Draft by Toronto FC, but was not offered a contract with the MLS team.

After trialing with several clubs in Europe, including Swedish side BK Häcken, Banks signed with USL Professional Division club Rochester Rhinos. He made his professional debut on April 15, 2011 in Rochester's season opening game against the Richmond Kickers, and scored his first professional goal on April 23 in a 3-2 win over the Dayton Dutch Lions. He was selected as the Rhinos' rookie of the year following his first professional season.  Rochester re-signed Banks for the 2012 season on October 25, 2011. He was voted the Rhinos' MVP after the 2012 season, tallying 5 goals and a league leading 8 assists. He again received this honor in 2014 after totaling 3 assists and a career high 9 goals. He was also named Offensive Player of the Year in 2012 & 2014, USL PRO Assists Champion & PRO First XI in 2012, and USL All League Second Team in 2014.

On December 11, 2014, Minnesota United FC announced that they had signed Banks. He made his league debut for the club on April 25, 2015, coming on as an 85th minute substitute for Jonny Steele in a 2-2 home draw with the San Antonio Scorpions. He scored his first league goal for the club on June 6, 2015 in a 1-1 away draw with the Carolina RailHawks. His goal, scored in the 48th minute, made the score 1-0 to Minnesota United.

On January 25, 2017, Jacksonville Armada FC announced that they had signed Banks. He made his league debut for the club on April 2, 2017 in a 1-0 home victory over FC Edmonton. Banks made an immediate impact with his new club, scoring the winning goal in the 77th minute.

In December 2018, Banks joined USL League One club Forward Madison FC ahead of their inaugural season. He made his league debut for the club on April 6, 2019 in a 1-0 away defeat to Chattanooga Red Wolves SC.

Banks announced his retirement from playing professional soccer on February 5, 2021.

Personal
J. C.'s father, Jimmy Banks, played soccer for Milwaukee Wave and with the United States men's national soccer team at the 1987 Pan American Games and in qualification for, and in, the 1990 FIFA World Cup.

References

External links

 Green Bay profile
 J.C. Banks at North American Soccer League
 
 

1989 births
Living people
American soccer players
People from Milwaukee County, Wisconsin
Soccer players from Milwaukee
Association football forwards
Green Bay Phoenix men's soccer players
Chicago Fire U-23 players
Toronto FC draft picks
Rochester New York FC players
Minnesota United FC (2010–2016) players
Jacksonville Armada FC players
Forward Madison FC players
North American Soccer League players
USL Championship players
USL League One players
USL League Two players
National Premier Soccer League players